Fuori dall'hype is the fourth studio album by Italian band Pinguini Tattici Nucleari. The album was released by Sony Music on 5 April 2019. It debuted and peaked at number twelve on the Italian Albums Chart, becoming the band's first entry. On 7 February 2020, the album was reissued as an expanded version titled Fuori dall'hype - Ringo Starr, which contains the title track "Ringo Starr", the song that the band participated with at the Sanremo Music Festival 2020. The reissued edition reached number two on the FIMI charts, making it the band's highest peak.

Track listing

Singles

Chart performance

Weekly charts

Fuori dall'hype

Fuori dall'hype - Ringo Starr

Year-end charts

Certifications

References

2019 albums
Italian-language albums
Pinguini Tattici Nucleari albums